Duchess of Chandos may refer to:

Anna Eliza Brydges, Duchess of Chandos
Cassandra Willoughby, Duchess of Chandos